Grassing may refer to

 Grassing, an Informant, a person who provides privileged information about a person or organization to an agency.
 Grassing (textiles), an old method of bleaching.